Mill A is a small unincorporated community in Skamania County in the southwestern part of the U.S. state of Washington. It is near the southernmost edge of the Gifford Pinchot National Forest and lies between Willard to the north and Cook to the south.

Geography

Parks and recreation

Mill A is located next to the Little White Salmon River, a popular local spot for white water kayaking. The Willard National Fish Hatchery is also situated on the river, just outside of the town. Other activities such as wind-surfing, skiing, snow boarding, camping, hunting, fishing, bicycling, golfing, and boating are also popular near Mill A and other communities. Nearby hiking locations include Dog Mountain, Indian Heaven, and Beacon Rock State Park. There is also nearby access to the Pacific Crest Trail.

Education
Mill A is located in the Mill A School District, home to both the Mill A Elementary School and Pacific Crest Innovation Academy. This district contains about 491 residents.

References

Unincorporated communities in Skamania County, Washington
Unincorporated communities in Washington (state)
Gifford Pinchot National Forest